Sing Ubon Football Club (Thai สโมสรฟุตบอลสิงห์อุบล), is a Thai Amateur football club based in Ubon Ratchathani. The club was formed in 2013 and entered the Ngor Royal Cup. Next seasons will move to Regional League Division 3. The club is currently playing in the 2018 Thailand Amateur League Bangkok Metropolitan Region.

Seasonal Record

P = Played
W = Games won
D = Games drawn
L = Games lost
F = Goals for
A = Goals against
Pts = Points
Pos = Final position

QR1 = First Qualifying Round
QR2 = Second Qualifying Round
R1 = Round 1
R2 = Round 2
R3 = Round 3
R4 = Round 4

R5 = Round 5
R6 = Round 6
QF = Quarter-finals
SF = Semi-finals
RU = Runners-up
W = Winners

References

 http://www.supersubthailand.com/news/14082-33/index.html#sthash.9ILfwmX3.dpbs
 Sing Ubon news
 https://www.youtube.com/watch?v=0Xh3UjDK8EM
 https://www.youtube.com/watch?v=gjgrwRC9c7w
 http://radio.prd.go.th/surin/ewt_news.php?nid=10440&filename=index
 https://www.khaosod.co.th/view_newsonline.php?newsid=TVRNNU9EYzNOakE1TUE9PQ==

External links
 Facebook Page

Association football clubs established in 2013
Football clubs in Thailand
Sport in Ubon Ratchathani province
2013 establishments in Thailand